Silvabestius is an extinct genus of marsupial dating to the Early Miocene. They were grazing animals about the size of a modern sheep.

This animal is known from two skulls found close together which have come to be known as the "Madonna and Child" fossils.

Silvabestius was 1 metre in length, with a skull about 25 cm long. It was a herbivore which browsed on soft plant matter such as leaves and stems and lived in an environment that largely consisted of tropical rainforest. Silvabestius is in the family Diprotodontidae and is therefore related to the extinct giant marsupial Diprotodon as well as to living koalas and wombats. Two well preserved Silvabestius skulls were found close together, believed to be from a mother and child, in Riversleigh, Queensland, Australia. The juvenile is believed to have been in the mother's pouch when they died.

References

 Pat Vickers Rich, Thomas Hewitt Rich, Francesco Coffa, and Steven Morton (1990) Wildlife of Gondwana: Dinosaurs and Other Vertebrates from the Ancient Supercontinent (Life of the Past). Indiana University Press.
  Long, J., Archer, M., Flannery, T., & Hand, S. (2002) Prehistoric mammals of Australia and New Guinea: One hundred million years of evolution. University of New South Wales Press (pg. 97)
 

Prehistoric vombatiforms
Miocene marsupials
Prehistoric mammals of Australia
Riversleigh fauna
Prehistoric marsupial genera